The 1990 United States Open Cup is the 77th edition of the tournament to crown the national champion of the United States. 

The A.A.C. Eagles (MSL) of Chicago won the cup 2–1 against the Brooklyn Italians (NESSL) at Kuntz Stadium in Indianapolis, Indiana.

Bracket

Regional semifinals 
I Philadelphia United German-Hungarians (PA) 4-2 Acton Colonials (MA)
I Brooklyn Italians (NY) 3-1 Beadling Blues (PA)
II A.A.C. Eagles(IL) 1-0 Madison 56ers (WI)
II Mike Duffy's (MO) 3-1 Craftsman Paint (MO)
III FC Dallas(TX) 2-1 Houston Meadows (TX)
III St. Petersburg Kickers (FL) 4-1 Atlanta Datagraphic (GA)
IV San Francisco Greek-American (CA) 1-0 Washington Fatigues (WA)
IV Los Angeles Zamora (CA) 2-1 OT Colorado Comets (CO)

Regional Finals 
I  United German-Hungarian USASA 3-5 Brooklyn Italians NESSL
II Mike Duffy's USASA 0-1 A.A.C. Eagles MSL
III FC Dallas LSSA 1-0 St. Petersburg Kickers FSSL
IV Los Angeles Zamora CA 2-1 OT Greek-American SFSFL

National semifinals 
Los Angeles Zamora CA 0-4 OT Brooklyn Italians NESSL
A.A.C. Eagles MSL 3-0 FC Dallas LSSA

Championship

External links
 1990 U.S. Open Cup results

References 

U.S. Open Cup
Cup